The departments of Paraguay are divided into districts (distritos).

List of districts
List of 161 of the 262 districts of Paraguay, showing the population (2002 census) and the department.

(*) This district was created recently, and there's not official data yet.

 
Subdivisions of Paraguay
Paraguay, Districts
Districts, Paraguay
Paraguay geography-related lists